Last Summer At Mars Hill (2013) is the first short story collection by American writer Elizabeth Hand. It contains the Nebula Award-winning story of the same name.  It also contains her first ever published story, "Prince of Flowers". Many of the stories have themes that prefigure those of her novels. For example, "The Bacchae" is thematically similar to aspects of Waking the Moon and "Prince of Flowers" 'grew into the poisonous bloom of Winterlong'. "In the Month of Athyr" is set in the same universe as Hand's first three novels.

All of the stories were previously published in various magazines.

Contents

"Last Summer At Mars Hill"
The Erl King"
"Justice"
"Dionysus Dendrites"
"The Have-Nots"
"In the Month of Athyr"
"Engels Unaware"
"The Bacchae"
"Snow on Sugar Mountain"
"On the Town Route"
"The Boy on the Tree"
"Prince of Flowers"

References

External links
 Elizabeth Hand website

American short story collections
2013 short story collections
Nebula Award for Best Novella-winning works
Works by Elizabeth Hand
World Fantasy Award for Best Novella winners
HarperCollins books